This article is a list of airlines currently operating in Equatorial Guinea.

List

See also
 List of airlines
 List of air carriers banned in the European Union
 List of defunct airlines of Equatorial Guinea

Airlines
Equatorial Guinea
Airlines
Equatorial Guinea